The B'nai Yosef Synagogue (or Congregation Bnai Yosef), formerly Magen David Congregation of Ocean Parkway, is an Orthodox Sephardi synagogue at the 1616 Ocean Parkway and Avenue P in Brooklyn, New York. It is considered "America's busiest synagogue for Middle and Near Eastern Jews", with over 30 prayer services daily.

Built in the early 1970s, it became known as The Painted Shul, because its  interior is covered in brightly painted murals, making it the only completely muraled synagogue in the world. The synagogue is also unusual in that it was built and is funded by an anonymous individual; thus members are not required to pay any dues.

The congregation
The B'nai Yosef congregation is made up of Sephardi Jews, mostly from Syria, North Africa and Iran, and the nusach (style of prayer service) is Orthodox Sephardi. The congregation is strict in its observance, with most males having had a yeshiva education.

Synagogue building
The synagogue building is located at the 1616 Ocean Parkway and Avenue P in Brooklyn, New York. Built in the early 1970s by an anonymous individual, the three-story, brick-facaded building is unremarkable from the outside. The synagogue walls have tall, smoked glass windows that allow light into the sanctuary. In the sanctuary, an elaborate chandelier hangs over the bimah.

Murals
The synagogue is known as "The Painted Shul", because its  interior is covered in brightly painted murals, making it the only completely muraled synagogue in the world. Every inch of wall space, including the prayer hall, is covered with murals painted by Archie Rand, professor of art at Brooklyn College, fellow of the Guggenheim Foundation, and a Laureate of the National Foundation for Jewish Culture. Rand's involvement in painting the synagogue began when, unable to pay the tuition fees at his daughter's school, he painted three murals for the school in exchange for a year's tuition. The school loved the murals and Rand was approached to paint the interior of the new B'nai Yosef synagogue.

Rand had only a basic Hebrew school education, and had to engage in intensive study one-on-one with yeshiva students, including at the Lakewood yeshiva in Lakewood, New Jersey, in order to learn about the symbolism that would be most meaningful to the congregation.

The work was controversial at first, with a group of community rabbis accusing Rand of idolatry. Rabbi Lopian, a local supporter of the murals, took the dispute to Rabbi Moshe Feinstein, who was regarded at the time as the de facto supreme rabbinic authority in North America for Orthodox Jewry. Feinstein declared that "the work is kosher and the spirit under which the work was done is commendable," and so Rand was able to complete  his project. The murals have since become much loved within the community, and the former Sephardic chief rabbi of Israel, Rav Ovadia Yosef, has been a frequent visitor.

The murals include an illustration of the bronze menorah by Benno Elkan that stands outside the Knesset in Jerusalem, and representations of the first days of creation, with the first ten things created before the first Sabbath represented by images that include a donkey's head, Noah's rainbow, and Miriam's well. At the back of the prayer hall, there is a blue-circle mandala containing the meditation: "My Lord, open my lips, that my mouth may declare Your Praise."

The women's section upstairs contains images of Jewish holidays, such as Rosh Hashanah and Passover, and a depiction of Rachel's Tomb.

The murals, started in 1974, took three years to complete.

A documentary entitled "The Painted Shul", was made about the murals and Archie Rand's experience by filmmaker Amala Lane and produced by Marji Greenhut in 2003, with minor changes made more recently in 2006. Featuring extensive footage of the stunning and widely varied painting styles, viewers get a glimpse of one of the world's few 'painted shuls'.  The tradition of religious painting in synagogues is centuries old, but such murals can only be found in ruins or modest replicas. B'nai Yosef is an actively used synagogue and the murals which were painted in the early 1970s look vibrant and new today.

Synagogue Leadership
Haim Benoliel, Rabbi
Eddie Sitt, President
Gabriel A. Shrem (1916–1986), Cantor, Administrator
Moshe Yedid, Cantor
Albert Cohen, Cantor 
Raphael Cohen, Baal Koreh
Jack Cohen, Director of Special Programs
Florence Shrem Zeitouni, Office Administrator

See also
Sephardic Judaism
Syrian Jewish communities of the United States

Notes

References
, American Sephardi Foundation. Accessed March 29, 2008.

External links

Tara Bahrampour, "Neighborhood Report: Gravesend; 7-11 Fought as the Thin Edge Of an Undesirable Wedge", The New York Times, June 4, 2000
Five Columbia Professors Receive Presidential Awards for Excellence in Teaching
"Religion and Art: Allies or Adversaries?", Fordham Online, February 16, 2007.

Iranian-American culture in New York (state)
Iranian-Jewish culture in the United States
Middle Eastern-American culture in New York City
North African American culture in New York (state)
Orthodox synagogues in New York City
Sephardi synagogues
Synagogues in Brooklyn
Sephardi Jewish culture in New York City
Syrian-American culture in New York City
Syrian-Jewish culture in New York (state)
1970s establishments in New York City
Gravesend, Brooklyn